Shalë is a former municipality in the Shkodër County, northwestern Albania. At the 2015 local government reform it became a subdivision of the municipality Shkodër. The population at the 2011 census was 1,804. Its name comes from the Shala tribe which lives in the area. The municipal unit covers the upper course of the river Shalë, and part of the Accursed Mountains range. There are eleven small mountain villages in the municipality: Breg-Lumi, Abat, Nicaj-Shalë, Lekaj, Vuksanaj, Pecaj, Theth, Ndërhysaj, Gimaj, Nen-Mavriq, Mekshaj, and Lotaj.

Gallery

References

External links
Municipality of Shale Official Website

Former municipalities in Shkodër County
Accursed Mountains
Administrative units of Shkodër